Nippon Fujin (Japanese: 日本婦人;Japanese Women) was a Japanese political women's magazine targeting women. The magazine was one of the best-selling magazines during World War II in Japan. It existed between 1942 and 1945.

History and profile
Nippon Fujin was started in 1942 by a women's organization, Dai Nippon Kokubo Fujinkai (Japanese: Greater Japan Women Association). The association was a patriotic and nationalist women's organization. The first issue appeared in November 1942. The magazine was published on a monthly basis. It contained nationalist propaganda material during the wartime. German historian Andrea Germer argues that visual propaganda materials included in Nippon Fujin are closely similar to those in Frauen Warte, one of the Nazi periodicals targeting women. Nippon Fujin folded in January 1945 after producing twenty-four issues.

References

External links

1942 establishments in Japan
1945 disestablishments in Japan
Defunct political magazines published in Japan
Defunct women's magazines published in Japan
Fascist newspapers and magazines
Magazines established in 1942
Magazines disestablished in 1945
Monthly magazines published in Japan
Propaganda newspapers and magazines
Magazines published in Tokyo